The Copper Panic of 1789 was a monetary crisis of the early United States that was caused by debasement and loss of confidence in copper coins that occurred under the presidency of George Washington.

After the American Revolution, many states began minting their own coins largely in copper.  At first the coins were widely accepted and their usage was rarely impeded, whereas several attempts by the British Empire to introduce new coins to the Americas were met with resistance.  For several years there were high levels of confidence in these coins and knowledge that they were a high quality copper.

As more counterfeiters began production and caused minters to have to debase their coins to remain in business, the value of copper began to fall.  Several laws were passed during this time period, including the prohibiting of debased coins from being considered legal tender.  The State of New York prohibited the circulation of copper coins entirely.  The State of New Jersey in 1787 declared it would no longer accept any legal tender of other states for any debts. This furthered the decline in copper prices, forcing many minters to shut down, leaving only counterfeiters who produced extremely low quality coins.

By 1789 the market was completely flooded with debased coppers that were officially illegal and thus caused the citizens to lose all confidence in them. The Federal government attempted to value them at 48 coppers to the shilling, but merchants refused to cooperate and the coins became almost entirely worthless. At the height of the debasement, there was a 430% inflation rate for copper and commerce ceased, forcing several businesses and manufacturers to close down.

The situation was alleviated when the Bank of Philadelphia began issuing paper bank notes to replace the copper coins.  State governments sought to cooperate with the plan and thus established the small fiat currency as an active medium of trade.  With stability returning to the economy the value of copper also rose again, until it was almost back to normal values in most areas. Commerce began to flourish again as the monetary system had confidence restored. This event was largely a factor for the federal government establishing a stronger federal currency standard and initiating more federal taxes to empower a central authority.

References

Economic crises in the United States
Financial crises
History of banking
18th-century economic history
1789 in the United States
1789 in economics
Recessions in the United States
Copper